The Lethbridge Broncos were a junior ice hockey team in the Western Hockey League from 1974 until 1986. They played at the Lethbridge Sportsplex.

Division titles won: 1977–78, 1981–82
Regular season titles won: 1981–82
WHL Championships won: 1982–83
Memorial Cup Titles: None

History
The Broncos started out as the Swift Current Broncos in Swift Current, Saskatchewan, but moved to Lethbridge in 1974. The team had been losing money in Swift Current and the new Lethbridge Sportsplex was beckoning for a team. The Broncos played in Lethbridge for twelve seasons, winning the President's Cup in 1982–83. In the mid 1980s, the team came up for sale, and despite a large and loyal fanbase, the Broncos were bought by interests in Swift Current and moved back to their original home. Lethbridge was without WHL hockey for only one season however, as the Calgary Wranglers moved to the city, becoming the Lethbridge Hurricanes in 1987.

Season-by-season record

Note: GP = Games played, W = Wins, L = Losses, T = Ties Pts = Points, GF = Goals for, GA = Goals against

NHL alumni

Warren Babe
Dave Barr
Mike Berger
Rollie Boutin
Ron Delorme
Gerald Diduck
Archie Henderson
Ian Herbers
Matt Hervey
Earl Ingarfield, Jr.
Trent Kaese
Troy Loney
Marc Magnan
Ryan McGill
Mike Moller
Randy Moller
Jay More
Doug Morrison
Troy Murray
Steve Nemeth
Bill Oleschuk
Darcy Regier
Bob Rouse
Lindy Ruff
Rocky Saganiuk
Joe Sakic
Darin Sceviour
Vern Smith
Brent Sutter
Brian Sutter
Darryl Sutter
Duane Sutter
Rich Sutter
Ron Sutter
Steve Tambellini
Alex Tidey
Mark Tinordi
Bryan Trottier
Gord Williams
Ken Wregget

Head coaches
Mike Shabaga 1970–71
Stan Dunn: 1970–71 to 1973–74
Earl Ingarfield 1974–75 to 1975–76
Mike Sauter 1976–77
Howie Yanosik 1977–78
Pat Ginnell 1978–79
Mike Sauter 1979–80
John Chapman 1980–81 to 1985–86
Graham James 1985–86

See also
List of ice hockey teams in Alberta

References
 2005–06 WHL Guide

Defunct ice hockey teams in Alberta
Sport in Lethbridge
Ice hockey clubs established in 1974
Defunct Western Hockey League teams
1974 establishments in Alberta
1986 disestablishments in Alberta
Sports clubs disestablished in 1986